The FGC-9 is a physible, 3D-printable semiautomatic pistol caliber carbine, first released in early 2020. Based on the Shuty AP-9 by Derwood, the FGC-9 was designed and first manufactured by a pseudonymous German-Kurdish gun designer named JStark1809.

The gun was designed to not require any potentially regulated firearm parts (under European Union laws) in order to enable people in countries with restrictive gun control laws to manufacture it. The weapon is a mix of fabricated 3D printed parts, easily manufactured metal pressure-bearing parts, and readily available springs, screws, nuts, and bolts.

The FGC-9 release was accompanied by thorough documentation to aid construction and assembly. The documentation has been translated into several other languages since it was first published. In April 2021, the MkII revision was released, with several updates designed to make building process simpler. The files for the firearm's manufacture are available across the internet.

Etymology
The gun's name is an initialism for "Fuck Gun Control", with the "9" referencing its 9mm cartridge.

Origin
The FGC-9 was originally designed and manufactured between 2018 and 2020 by JStark1809, a pseudonymous Kurdish  gun designer, with contributions from the "guerrilla 3D-gun file development group" Deterrence Dispensed, and was released on March 27, 2020 by Deterrence Dispensed and JStark1809. The core mechanical design elements are based on an earlier 3D printable design, the Shuty AP-9 pistol by Derwood, with a multitude of mechanical, ergonomic and constructive changes and improvements having been done to the AP-9 foundation. The "Shuty" relies on several factory-made or extensively machined gun parts (like the barrel) in order to be completed. This poses a challenge to would-be builders in jurisdictions that regulate and restrict such components or those without access to a machining workshop. The gun is also influenced by Philip Luty's SMG designs.

The FGC-9 eliminates the need for factory-made gun parts or reliance on the advanced fabrication skills of the maker. The FGC-9 is designed with Europeans in mind; fasteners and build materials use the metric standard and are available from hardware stores. The magazine can be 3D printed, and the entire design works without needing any regulated, commercial gun parts. The FGC-9's barrel can be completed in several ways, including the easily adopted method of electrochemical machining.

Mark II
An extensively updated design, the MkII was first announced on October 23, 2020 by En Bloc Press. Designer JStark1809 produced the MkII with help from designers "3socksandcrocs" and "Ivan the Troll". It was released on April 16, 2021 on Odysee by user "The Gatalog". The updated weapon uses a H&K MP5 style charging handle, an improved electro-chemical machining process to make the barrel, and some ergonomic improvements as well. The release was the final package in a string of multiple smaller releases, which included the improved barrel ECMv2.0 process, and the Menendez Mag v2.0, and the Common Sense Fire Control Group AR-15 printable trigger, all created by Ivan The Troll in preparation for the FGC-9 MkII release.

Modifications
Due to the open-source nature of the FGC-9, there have been many packages released that alter the configuration, caliber, ergonomics, and other legally-restrictive qualities of the base-model firearm. These are all available through a wide variety of channels, all with different levels of testing, and allow the end user to customize their weapon as needed. One very common branch is replacing the buttstock with an ATF-approved pistol brace, in order for U.S. citizens to comply with NFA rifle and pistol requirements.

Materials

The upper and lower receivers of the FGC-9 are fully 3D-printed, as are the pistol grip and stock. The structure of the magazine, based on the Glock magazine, can also be printed. For the MkI, an AR-15 or modified airsoft trigger system is needed for the fire control. In the MkII release, the developers released a package to 3D-print the AR-15 trigger. The barrel can be rifled polygonally through electrochemical machining. Designer IvanTheTroll estimated the tooling cost for a completed FGC-9, including the price of the printer (~$200) and electrochemical machining equipment (~$100), at $500; and JStark1809 estimated it takes 1.5 to 2 weeks to build.

Availability
The gun's 3D-printing files were released in open-source onto DEFCAD by JStark1809 and then onto various hosting platforms by Deterrence Dispensed such as Odysee, a free-speech blockchain based video, audio and file hosting site using the LBRY protocol.

According to Rajan Basra, a professor at International Centre for the Study of Radicalisation at King's College London, the FGC is particularly popular among far-right groups due to the sharing of its instructions in extremist internet forums.

Investigations 

Jake Hanrahan of Popular Front interviewed JStark1809 about the FGC-9 and 3D printed guns in November 2020. JStark1809 stated that he had no background in engineering, taught himself CAD, and learned what he needed through widely available resources on the internet. With his rudimentary operation, he showed how to manufacture an FGC-9 in two weeks or less. He shot the gun in a forest and demonstrated its reliability and rapid firing rate. JStark1809 described his absolutist belief in the right to keep and manufacture arms and his desire to make the weapons widely available in order to protect human rights. Hanrahan described him as "one of the most dangerous people" he had ever met and criticized authorities for underestimating the power of 3D-printed guns.

Der Spiegel reported in October 2021 that British financial services had provided clues on the identity of JStark1809 to the Federal Criminal Police Office, and they identified a 28-year-old man in Völklingen who went by "Jacob D." Police had raided his home that June, though they found no weapons and did not take him into custody. Two days after the raid, he was found dead in his car in front of his parents' home in Hannover. Coroners determined the cause of death to be a heart attack and ruled out foul play.

Users
 : MkII variant used by rebel forces in the 2021-2022 Myanmar protests.
Complete and incomplete models have been recovered by police forces in the European Union, United Kingdom Australia, New Zealand, and Canada

MkII variant seen in the hands of a member of the dissident Irish republican paramilitary Óglaigh na hÉireann during a parade in Easter 2022.,

See also
 List of notable 3D printed weapons and parts
 Ghost guns (privately made firearms)

References

External links
 FGC-9 on Odysee
 FGC-9 MKII on Odysee

Handguns
3D printed firearms
Weapons and ammunition introduced in 2020
Weapons and ammunition introduced in 2021